Silk River may refer to:

 Geum River, a major river in South Korea
 Silk Stream, a waterway in London, England